Pietro Igneo (died 11 November 1089) was an Italian Roman Catholic Benedictine monk from the Vallombrosians branch. He also served as a cardinal and was named as the Cardinal-Bishop of Albano. He is often referred to as a member of the Aldobrandini house but this familiar denomination is not attested in sources as a fact.

Igneo's beatification had been confirmed on 4 March 1673.

Life
Pietro Igneo was born to a noble family in Florence. He was a relative to John Gualbert, and the uncle of Bernardo degli Uberti. He had at least one sibling.

Pietro entered the Order of Saint Benedict in 1018 as a monk.

Bishop Pietro Mezzobarbo had been accused of simoniacal acquisition of the episcopal dignities. Mezzobarbo denied these charges to the utmost and had numerous and prominent supporters. This accusation turned into conflict and intense agitation in Florence. The Vallombrosian monks were his chief accusers and upon the insistence of the people for proof the judgment of God - or a trial through fire - was resorted to settle the matter. The abbot (and his relative) John Gualbert designated for the test Pietro who underwent the ordeal on 23 February 1068 (he succeeded) and was hence called "Igneo" which meant "fire-tried". This triumph of the monks led to a confession on the part of the bishop.

Igneo soon became the abbot for San Salvatore in Fucecchio and he held that position until 1081. In 1072 he was designated as a cardinal and Pope Alexander II named him Cardinal-Bishop of Albano. Igneo attended the October 1072 consecration of the church of Santi Donato e Nicola in Albano while he himself consecrated the church of San Miniatis in Rubbicana on 7 February 1077.

He cooperated with Pope Gregory VII to repress simony and reform church discipline. Gregory VII entrusted him with several important missions: in 1079 he served as a papal legate in the German kingdom with the Bishop of Padua to mediate between the Emperor Henry IV and Rudolf of Swabia. Upon the renewal of the excommunication against the emperor at Salerno in 1084 he was designated - at Pope Gregory VII's behest - as one of the two legates sent to France for the promulgation of the sentence. He is mentioned in the papal bull of Pope Urban II on 8 July 1089 and is attested for the last time in the papal curia in September 1089.

Igneo served as a co-consecrator for the episcopal consecration of the new Pope Victor III in 1087. He participated in the conclaves held in 1086 and in 1088.

He died on 11 November 1089.

References

Further reading
 H.W. Klewitz, Reformpapsttum und Kardinalkolleg, Darmstadt 1957, p. 116 no. 9.
 R. Hüls, Kardinäle, Klerus und Kirchen Roms: 1049-1130, Tübingen 1977, p. 90-91.

External links
 Catholic Online
 Santi e Beati
 Catholic Hierarchy

1089 deaths
11th-century Italian cardinals
11th-century Christian saints
11th-century Italian Roman Catholic bishops
Benedictine abbots
Benedictine beatified people
Benedictine cardinals
Cardinal-bishops of Albano
External cardinals
Italian Benedictines
Clergy from Florence
People of medieval Rome
Year of birth unknown
Beatifications by Pope Clement X